This is a list of episodes of the seventeenth season of The Ellen DeGeneres Show (often stylized as ellen17), which began airing Monday, September 9, 2019.

Episodes

References

External links
 

17
2019 American television seasons
2020 American television seasons
Television series impacted by the COVID-19 pandemic